Luciana Percovich (born 25 July 1947) is an Italian non-fiction writer, a teacher, a translator and director of a series of books on women's history and spirituality.
She was born in Gorizia, Italy in a Mitteleuropean Italian speaking family forced to leave Fiume, Rijeka at the end of World War II, with cultural and geographical roots in Austria and Dalmatia, she spent her childhood and adolescence in Gorizia attending Classical studies. At the age of 18, she went to Milan to complete her education, and there she graduated in 1972 (Lingue e Letterature Straniere Moderne – Università degli Studi di Milano). 
She has been defined as "a traveller between worlds and a weaver of space-time connections for her ability of embracing distant wide horizons with a loving insight".

Women's Movement 
Since then, she lived and worked in Milano as a teacher, a translator, an author and an activist in many pioneering projects of the Women's Movement (women's health centers, bookshops, cultural and political training, publishing houses, etc.). 
During the university years, marked by the students' movement of 1968, she met the first women's consciousness rising groups which were bringing their critic to the core of the social economic and political structure. Patriarchal Attitudes (1970) by Eva Figes, one of the first feminist texts to be read in Italy, was for her a turning point. She joined Lotta Femminista, a group investigating the invisible economic role of female unpaid work, and soon after a collective on female body and health. They produced and published on their own Anticoncezionali dalla parte della donna (Birth control from the Women's side, 1974, translated in Portuguese in 1978), opened one of the first women's health clinics in a popular district of Milano, introduced the self-help practice brought to Italy from Los Angeles and by the Boston Women's Health Collective.  Within a couple of years, a multifaceted Health Women Movement spread all over Italy, which discussed and promoted information in national conferences in Milan, Rome, Florence. A law opening public health services for women was issued in 1975.

A small pamphlet, Witches, Midwives and Nurses by B. Ehrenreich and D. English brought from the US – which reconstructed from a totally new perspective who were the Witches and why they were burned for more than three centuries, was translated by Luciana and became a most popular text. Its publication (Le Streghe siamo noi. Il ruolo della medicina nella repression della donna, 1977) opened her first editorial experience as chief editor of a series of books called "Il Vaso Di Pandora" for La Salamandra Edizioni, a university publisher in Milano which was, together with La Tartaruga Edizioni-Milano and Edizioni delle Donne-Roma, one of the three independent feminist publishers of the Seventies and on.
This series of books lasted until 1986, and introduced to Italian readers works such as A Literature of One's own by E. Showalter and A feeling for the Organism, by Evelyn Fox Keller on Nobel Prize Barbara McClintock.

From 1975 to 1986 she was part of the Libreria delle Donne di Milano, which issued a series of periodical publications as vehicles of their political and cultural collective research (Sottosopra and the Catalogues of the Bookshop), and of the women's centres in Milano (Collettivo di Via Cerubini, Collettivo di Via Col di Lana, Cicip & Ciciap, Libera Università delle Donne). She travelled frequently to Roma, Firenze and Pescara and wrote articles for the women's reviews of that time, as Sottosopra, Orsaminore, Reti, Lapis, Fluttuaria, Madreperla.

The fields of Science and Environment
In 1985 she had a son, Pietro, with her life-long companion Giancarlo De Marinis. The Chernobyl disaster (26 April 1986) acted as a stimulus to a deeper research in the fields of Science and Environment, themes become central in her research since the groups on women's health and medicine
She taught at the Free Women's University affording a variety of topics, ranging from female aggressivity (1995), to women and Islam (1996) and the Cyber revolution (1997). She cooperated with different Centri Documentazione Donne in various parts of Italy. In the same years, she was a member of the Commissione Consultiva sui Temi della Donna della Provincia di Milano (Milan Provincial Commission on Women's issues).
In 1990 she was awarded for the translation of Memoirs of a Spacewoman by Naomi Mitchison (Premio Città di Monselice for Literary and Scientific Translation – chairmen Franco Fortini and Mario Luzi, Diario di una Astronauta, La Tartaruga, 1988), and produced some titles by female authors in Science Fiction.

The Sacred Feminine 
A new horizon opened during her travel to Australia where she met in Alice Springs the indigenous vision of life/nature/religion. Through the Aranda culture, as narrated by T.G.H. Strehlow (whose Central Australian Religion. Personal Monototemism in a Polytotemic Community she translated in 1997), she entered the path of the Sacred Feminine, that is of a radically different vision of the terrain occupied by monotheistic male religions in Europe and elsewhere. For some years, she investigated shamanic and kundalini practices, while reading a series of books produced by the pioneer women anthropologists and theologians of the Seventies and eventually the work of Marija Gimbutas. Reconstructing her-story (or history before the advent of patriarchy), reclaiming a cosmo-biological vision of the "divine in nature" (or "inclusive transcendence" in the words of the radical feminist theologian Mary Daly), investigating on myths and on the symbolic language of societies with  "women at the centre" have become the focus of her research from then on.

Mary Daly was invited to Italy by the Università delle donne di Milano in 2002 and by Armonie – Bologna in 2004. During that conference, "Dopo la Dea", she met an independent publisher, Chiara Orlandini – Venexia Editrice, and together they convened translating Quintessence by Daly and beginning a new collection of books on Women's history and spirituality, which was called "Le Civette Saggi" (2005).
The same year, for the Fondazione Badaracco/Archivi Riuniti delle Donne di Milano she published La Coscienza nel Corpo. Donne salute e medicina negli anni Settanta, a well-documented history of the health movement in Italy during the Seventies.
Retired from teaching at the Liceo Classico Manzoni di Milano, she moved to the country, to join the small familiar organic farm in Abruzzo.

In the following years she has introduced, and made their books available to Italian readers, the works of many women authors (Mary Daly, Marija Gimbutas, Vicki Noble, Tsultrim Allione, Starhawk, Genevieve Vaughan, Phyllis Currott, Kathy Jones, Heide Goettner-Abendroth among others). 
With Laima Association, the International Indigenous Cultures of Peace conferences have been organized in Torino (2012, 2013, 2015) and in Rome (in honor of Marija Gimbutas, 20 years after her death, 2014). 
In 2015 she has presented a panel on Earth based Spirituality of the Native cultures of the Past and Present at The Parliament of World Religions, in Salt Lake City, Utah, Usa; in 2016 she was invited at the Goddess Conference in Glastonbury, GB.
She works on the archetypes of the Goddess and in Crone Circles, a project to reclaim the Wise Women of the matriarchal traditions.

Books 
 Posizioni amorali e relazioni etiche, Melusine, Milano 1993. 
 La coscienza nel corpo. Donne, salute e medicina negli anni Settanta, Franco Angeli, Milano 2005.
 Oscure Madri Splendenti. Le origini del sacro e delle religioni, Venexia, Roma 2007.
 Colei che dà la vita. Colei che dà la forma. Miti di creazione femminili, Venexia, Roma 2009.
 She who gives life, She who gives form, Venexia, Roma 2021.
 Verso il Luogo delle Origini, Un percorso di ricerca del sé femminile, Scritti 1982–2014, Castelvecchi, Roma 2016.

Editor 
 'Donne del Nord/Donne del Sud. Verso una politica della relazione tra diversità, solidarietà e conflitto, Franco Angeli, Milano 1994.
 'Theodor G. H. Strehlow, I sentieri dei sogni. La religione degli aborigeni dell'Australia Centrale, Mimesis, Milano 1997.
 Dopo Pechino: Pensare globalmente, Agire localmente (Proceedings of the Conference), LUD, Milano 1995
  Marija Gimbutas. Venti anni di studi della Dea, Convegno alla Casa Internazionale delle Donne di Roma, 9-10 maggio 2014, Progetto Editoriale Laima, 2015.
 Heide Goettner Abendroth, Madri di Saggezza, La filosofia e la politica degli Studi Matriarcali Moderni, Castelvecchi, Roma 2020.

Editor and translator 
 Le streghe siamo noi, di Barbara Eherenreich-Deirdre English, Celuc Libri/La Salamandra, Milano 1975.
 In sintonia con l'organismo. La vita e l'opera di Barbara Mc Clintock, di Evelyn Fox Keller, La Salamandra, Milano 1987; Castelvecchi, Roma 2017.
 Diario di una Astronauta di Naomi Mitchison, La Tartaruga, Milano 1988; Mondadori Urania, Milano 1995: Castelvecchi, Roma 2013.
 La sapienza della Dea. Miti, meditazioni, simboli e siti sacri, di Dee Poth, Psiche 2, Torino 2010.
 Segni fuori dal Tempo. La vita e l'opera di Marija Gimbutas, di Donna Read e Starhawk, Psiche 2, Torino 2013.
 Nutri i tuoi Demoni. Meditazione guidata e intervista a Lama Tsultrim Allione, Psiche 2, Torino 2013.
 Società di Pace. Matriarcati del Passato, Presente e Futuro, a cura di H. Goettner-Abendroth, Un'Antologia, Castelvecchi, Roma 2018.

Handouts 1993–2003 of the courses of the Università delle Donne-Milano 
 Passaggi, Momenti della costruzione di sé, 1993; 
 Guerre che non ho visto: sull'aggressività femminile, 1995; 
 Islam e Islamismo: ne parlano le donne, 1996; 
 La rivoluzione Cyber, Nuove reti di Donne, 1997; 
 Mitologie del divino: immagini del sacro femminile, 1999; 
 Storie di Creazione: immagini del sacro femminile, 2001. 
 Mito-archeologia d'Europa: immagini del sacro femminile, 2002
 Il viaggio metapatriarcale di Mary Daly, 2003

A long essay (Posizioni amorali e relazioni etiche, Le Melusine, 1993) has been translated in Silvia Tubert (ed.), Figuras de la madre, Ediciones Catedra, Madrid 1996. 
English essays have been published in Trivia. Voices of Feminism 9, 2009; Nemeton. High Green Tech Magazine 1, 2010; She is everywhere volume 3, 2012; She Rises volume 1, 2015.

References

External links 
 Luciana Percovich on Academia.edu
 Luciana Percovich on WorldCat.org
 "Fondo Percovich" presso Archivi Fondazione Badaracco, Milano
 http://www.fondazionebadaracco.it/
 www.universitadelledonne.it
 www.autricidicivilta.it

1947 births
Living people
Feminists
Italian women writers
Italian writers
Italian women non-fiction writers
Feminist spirituality
Sacred feminine